Jamie Wilson is a former professional snooker player from Havant in Hampshire. He is known for his fast style of play, averaging among the top 10 players for average shot time in both the 2020/21 and 2021/22 seasons

Career
At the Q School 2020 – Event 3 at the English Institute of Sport in Sheffield, Wilson clinched a two-year Tour Card on to the 2020–21 and 2021-22 snooker seasons. Wilson defeated ex-professionals David Finbow and Fang Xiongman in deciding frames to reach the final round where he squeezed past Haydon Pinhey on the colours in another final frame decider. Aged just 16, Wilson was the youngest qualifier in 2020, and the youngest English player to ever qualify through Q School.

Wilson secured his first wins as a professional against Lukas Kleckers at the 2021 Snooker Shoot Out and from 3-1 down to win 4–3 against Duane Jones at Celtic Manor in the 2021 Welsh Open.

Performance and rankings timeline

References

2003 births
Living people
People from Havant
Sportspeople from Hampshire
English snooker players